Abro is a Pakistani television drama serial that originally aired on Hum TV on 20 December 2015. It was directed by Ilyas Kashmiri,  script by Qaisra Hayat and screenplay by Umera Ahmad. It stars Eshal Fayyaz, Noor Hassan Rizvi, Zainab Ahmed and Ahmed Zeb in pivot roles.

The show was moved from Sunday 8pm slot to the Saturday 8pm slot after Gul-e-Rana ended as Udaari took the Sunday evening slot. It also re-aired on Hum TV from July 3, 2017 to August 10, 2017.

Plot summary
Abro is based on two fatherless siblings Abro and Hamid. Their mother Sakina (Asma Abbas) worked as a peon in a college and works for the principal. Abro and Hamid do not respect their mother and are ill-mannered. Abro is in love with her friend Ali, son of Farzana and Zafar, brother of Abid, Samra and Tayyaba.

Abro and Ali like each other and want to marry but Ali's family doesn't like Abro's bad manners and doesn't accept her as their daughter-in-law. However, Ali has a cousin from his mother Farzana's side (Farzana's niece, Shahida's daughter), Fouzia Jamshed and Zarmina. Ali's family wants Ali to marry Fouzia but Ali refuses as he is already in love with Abro. Fouzia also likes Ali. At the engagement, Ali is not happy for his engagement. Abro leaves Ali but he forgives her and decides to break engagement with Fouzia. He finally breaks engagement with Fouzia and marries Abro as a court marriage. It shocks both families. They  live in Ali's friend's house but soon they decide to live on the upper building of Ali's family.

Ali's job does not bring in enough money so he is unable to fulfill some duties. They finally give birth to a child whose name, Afsheen, is chosen by Ali's mother. While, on other side, because of Ali and Fouzia's separation, Farzana and Zafar decide to marry Abid to Fouzia. Farzana's sister Shahida, mother of Fouzia, first thinks that Abid is younger than Fouzia but they marry. The show skips ahead 4 months and Abid and Fouzia have a child whose name is chosen by Farzana as Ahmed Ali. Ali's parents also marry Samra and Tayyaba in good dynasties. Abid does more to help his brother in any way. Afsheen cries a lot, Ali decides to sell his bike to take something for her (Afsheen).

Fouzia also gives birth later to a daughter, Aima. Ali's mother treats Abro as a servant. Hamid is also in love with another woman and secretly marries her and goes to Kuwait. The show again takes leap of 4 years when Afsheen, Ahmed Ali and Aima became school age pupils. Ali asks Abid to help him in Afsheen's school that Afsheen can learn but Farzana comes and refuses it. The show again takes leap of 20 years leap when all these pupils became 20-year-old boys and girls. In this time, all are changed. Afsheen does all things that Abro didn't do for her mother. She also pays concentration on studies.

Ahmed Ali and Aima grow and are very bad to their parents. They do not study well and do not follow what their parents tell. Unfortunately, Afsheen can't continue her dream to be a doctor due to financial issues with her family and she does a Bachelor of Arts instead. Ahmed loves Afsheen too, but Afsheen doesn't know. Fauzia still does not like Abro and her family. Afsheen is harassed by a man at the college and didn't go there for a week. Farzana forces Afsheen to marry a man whom initially was meant to marry Aima, but later backed out as the family wanted a traditional girl, not a modernized girl (Aima). At the end of the play, Ahmad tried to convince Afsheen to run away with her. However, afsheen when thinks of her parent's trust in her, refuses to run with Ahmed and asks him to marry Samra's daughter and gives up on his love. But their whole conversation is heard by Abid, Fouzia and their grandmother. Ali and Fouzia feel very ashamed of not bringing up their children better and praises Afsheen for her respectable behaviour and dignity.

Moreover, Aima turns out having friendship with a boy named Fahad, who happens to be a thief, and wanted by police. Once the police visits Aima's house to take cell phone gifted to Aima by Fahad (which was actually stolen from a rich woman), her parents get even more ashamed. Already regretting their leniency in bringing up children, they decide to stop Aima from going to college. Meanwhile, the grandmother also ashamed of trusting Fouzia and hating Abro realizes her mistake and forgives Abro and her son, also asks for Abro's forgiveness. At the end they decide to get Ahmed engaged to Afsheen. Ammara's daughter Sania, who was expected fiancée of Ahmed also confronts Ahmed about his emotions for Afsheen and about her plans of not desiring any stay in Pakistan or marrying Ahmed. Drama ends with Ahmed and Afsheen's engagement, where everyone is happy and giving blessing to each other.

Cast 
 Eshal Fayyaz as Abroo
 Noor Hassan Rizvi as Ali Zafar
 Zainab Ahmed as Fouzia Jamshed
 Ahmad Zeb as Abid Zafar
 Ehteshamuddin as Zafar
 Asma Abbas as Sakina
 Ismat Zaidi as College Principal
 Akbar Islam as Jamshed
 Humaira Bano as Shahida
 Farah Shah as Zubaida
 Arisha Razi as Aima
 Tabrez Ali Shah as Ahmed
 Hina Altaf as Afsheen
 Imran Ashraf as Hamid
 Rimha Khan as Sania

Reception
The drama series became popular soon after it went on-air. It made Hum TV the slot leader on Sundays. Just in its first episode, Abro achieved a TRP of 2.8 (over the 15 mins time slot of 8:30pm–8:45pm) on 20 December 2015. Over the 70 mins time slot (8pm-9:10pm) on the same day, Abro achieved a TRP of 2.1.

In the U.K., Abro'''s first episode raked in 33,600 viewers at 8pm, whereas the second episode attracted 36,200 viewers. Escalating further, the third episode of Abro in U.K. registered 63,700 viewers. The ninth episode recorded 98,800 viewers, making it the most watched on the channel. The eleventh episode garnered 79,000 viewers. The thirteenth episode broke records as Abro delivered 111,100 viewers – peaking at 136,400 viewers.

In Pakistan, the thirteenth episode Abro gained a TRP of 4.6 (over the 15 mins time slot of 8:30pm–8:45pm) on 13 March 2016. Over the 70 mins time slot (8pm-9:10pm) on the same day, Abro'' achieved a TRP of 3.3, making it a place in the top 3 dramas during the time. It is the most watched on the channel on Sundays. It is quite popular in the UK with over 60,000 views per episode on average.

See also
 2015 in Pakistani television
 List of programs broadcast by Hum TV

References

External links 

 Official Website
 Abro drama on google

2015 Pakistani television series debuts
2016 Pakistani television series endings
Diyar-e-Dil
Hum TV
Hum Network Limited
Hum TV original programming
Urdu-language television shows
Pakistani telenovelas
Pakistani romantic drama television series
Television series by MD Productions
MD Productions